SGSP (Australia) Assets Pty Ltd (SGSPAA), trading as Jemena, is an Australian company that owns, manages or operates energy infrastructure assets in the eastern states of Australia including Queensland and New South Wales, and gas pipelines and gas and electricity distribution networks in Victoria and the Northern Territory. It is 60% owned by State Grid Corporation of China and 40% by Singapore Power.

History
In January 1995, the vertical monopolist energy supplier, the State Energy Commission of Western Australia, was dis-aggregated into separate gas and electricity corporations, leading to the formation of AlintaGas. On 13 July 2000 legislation was passed by the Parliament of Western Australia for the sale of AlintaGas, which listed on the Australian Stock Exchange (ASX) on 17 October 2000. On 8 May 2003 AlintaGas Ltd changed its name to Alinta Limited. Alinta acquired infrastructure assets and the Agility business from AGL through a combination of merger and demerger transactions on 25 October 2006.

Alinta was acquired on 31 August 2007 by a consortium comprising Singapore Power International (SPI), the largest utility company in Singapore, and Australia's second-largest investment bank, Babcock & Brown Infrastructure (BBI) and Babcock & Brown Power (BBP) with a bid of A$13.9 billion, outbidding a bid by Macquarie Bank. After acquisition, the Alinta businesses were split up.  The majority of eastern assets were transferred to Alinta AGL, an Alinta subsidiary, which on 4 August 2008 changed its name to Jemena. Later, ownership of Jemena passed to Singapore Power International, and its name was changed to SPI (Australia) Assets Pty Ltd. In 2014, State Grid Corporation of China acquired a 60% stake in Jemena, and the company's name was changed to SGSP (Australia) Assets Pty Ltd (SGSPAA). The company continues to trade as Jemena.

Assets
Jemena's main assets and activities are:
 An asset management business in the eastern States
 Colongra gas transmission and storage facility, New South Wales
 Jemena Gas Networks gas distribution network, New South Wales
 ActewAGL gas distribution network, Australian Capital Territory (50%)
 ActewAGL electricity distribution network, Australian Capital Territory (50%)
 Jemena Electricity Networks electricity distribution network, Victoria
 Eastern Gas Pipeline, New South Wales and Victoria
 VicHub, Victoria
 Queensland Gas Pipeline
 Northern Gas Pipeline
Zinfra Pty Ltd, an engineering, construction and maintenance service provider to the utility infrastructure sector. (100%)

See also
 Western Power
 Alinta

References

Companies based in Melbourne
Natural gas companies of Australia
Electric power distribution network operators in Australia